Thomas Barclay (c. 1570–1632) was a Scottish jurist, professor at Toulouse and Poitiers.

Life
Barclay was a native of Aberdeen, but as a young man he studied humane letters and philosophy at Bordeaux. Here he gained the support of Robert Balfour, the Aristotelian scholar.

It was about 1596 that Dempster left Paris, intending to work his way to Toulouse. Here Barclay concentrated on law; and accepted the offer of a regius professorship at Poitiers. His reputation procured a recall to Toulouse, where he was still living when Dempster drew up his Historia Ecclesiastica about 1620. Dempster states that his lectures on civil law were well attended. He left no written works.

References

Attribution

Scottish scholars and academics
17th-century scholars
17th-century Scottish people
16th-century births
17th-century deaths
Academic staff of the University of Toulouse
Academic staff of the University of Poitiers
University of Bordeaux alumni
British scholars of ancient Greek philosophy
People from Aberdeen
1570s births
Year of birth uncertain
1632 deaths